The Four Points by Sheraton, previously known as the Golden Sands Tower, is a 43-floor hotel tower in Dubai, United Arab Emirates. The building, constructed of steel and glass, has a total structural height of 166 m (545 ft), and currently stands as the 40th-tallest structure in the Dubai. Construction of the tower began in 2005 and was completed in early 2007. The hotel is operated by Four Points by Sheraton, and stands as one of the tallest all-hotel structures in the city. However, the building does not surpass the Burj Al Arab or the Rose Tower to become the tallest hotel in Dubai.

History 
The Four Points by Sheraton was originally proposed for construction as the Golden Sands Tower. The building was designed as a 43 floor all-residential apartment tower; it began construction in 2004, with a set estimated completion date of 2006. Starwood entered the project after construction had already begun, and the building was subsequently renamed Four Points by Sheraton Sheikh Zayed Road. The building plans were revised to provide for the addition of a Four Points by Sheraton hotel, and the tower was redesigned to contain both hotel and residential units, as well as a helipad.  However, plans for the inclusion of residential units were later abandoned. The building was structurally completed in early 2007 and fully completed later that year.

The Four Points by Sheraton Sheikh Zayed Road is one of three hotels operated by the Sheraton Four Points brand in Dubai, the others being the Four Points by Sheraton Downtown Dubai and the Four Points by sheraton Bur Dubai.

See also 
 List of tallest buildings in Dubai

References

External links 
 

Hotel buildings completed in 2007
Skyscraper hotels in Dubai
Residential skyscrapers in Dubai